The 2017 Women's NORCECA Volleyball Championship was the 25th edition of the tournament, and played from 26 September to 16 October 2017 in Canada, Dominican Republic, and Trinidad and Tobago. The top two teams of each pools qualified for 2018 FIVB Volleyball Women's World Championship

Qualification
The top six teams from NORCECA ranking qualified directly, except United States, the reigning World champion. Other six teams will qualify though the zonal qualification.

Pools composition

Competition

Pool A
Venue:  Santo Domingo, Dominican Republic
Date: 13–15 October 2017

Pool B
Venue:  Vancouver, Canada
Date: 28–30 September 2017

Pool C
Venue:  Port of Spain, Trinidad and Tobago
Date: 13–15 October 2017

References

External links

Women's NORCECA Volleyball Championship
NORCECA
Volley
Volley
Volley
NORCECA
NORCECA
Sport in Port of Spain
NORCECA
Volley
Volleyball in Trinidad and Tobago
2010s in Vancouver
NORCECA
NORCECA
NORCECA
NORCECA